Lohur is a jamoat in Tajikistan. It is located in Danghara District in Khatlon Region. The jamoat has a total population of 6,648 (2015).

References

Populated places in Khatlon Region
Jamoats of Tajikistan